True Believers is the second solo album by John Schumann, previously the frontman of Redgum. Released in 1993, it was reissued in 2009.

Album artwork
The cover art shows a black and white photomosaic of various famous and influential Australians from the time the album was released, with Schumann in the middle, the only face in color.

Track listing

"If I Close My Eyes"
"Leigh Creek Road"
"Fallen Angel"
"Eyes on Fire"
"Working Class Man"
"Roll On The Day"
"Clancy of the Overflow"
"If The War Goes On"
"Hyde Park Calling (King William Road, Scene 1)"
"Plympton High"
"Eyes on Fire" (acoustic)
"If I Close My Eyes" (reprise)

References

External links
 The Redgum Lyrics Archive - True Believers

1993 albums
John Schumann albums
Columbia Records albums